Danton is a 1931 German historical drama film directed by Hans Behrendt and starring Fritz Kortner, Lucie Mannheim and Gustaf Gründgens. It depicts the dramatic downfall and execution of Georges Danton in 1794 at the hands of Maximilien Robespierre.

Plot 
The film is set in France at the time of the French Revolution. The revolutionaries are discussing what happened to King Louis XVI should happen. The group around Georges Danton advocates the execution. The king is tried and executed. Further trials against nobles followed and death sentences were pronounced en masse. When Danton visits a prison, he falls in love with the prisoner Louise Gély. Now Danton comes into conflict with his opponent Robespierre. Robespierre succeeds in bringing Danton to the dock and his former comrade-in-arms Danton is also sentenced to death and executed under the guillotine.

Cast
 Fritz Kortner as Danton
 Lucie Mannheim as Louise Gely
 Gustaf Gründgens as Robespierre
 Alexander Granach as Marat
 Gustav von Wangenheim as Desmoulins
 Werner Schott as St. Just
 Hermann Speelmans as Legendre
 Georg John as Fouquier-Tinville
 Walter Werner as Malsherbes
 Ernst Stahl-Nachbaur as Louis XVI
 Georg H. Schnell as The Duke of Coburg
 Ferdinand Hart as General Dumouriez
 Carl Goetz as Kleinrentner
 Till Klockow as Cornelia
 Friedrich Gnaß as Sanson

See also
 Danton (1921)

References

Bibliography

External links
 

1931 films
1930s historical films
German historical films
Films of the Weimar Republic
1930s German-language films
Films directed by Hans Behrendt
Remakes of German films
Sound film remakes of silent films
Films about Georges Danton
Cultural depictions of Georges Danton
Cultural depictions of Maximilien Robespierre
Cultural depictions of Louis XVI
Cine-Allianz films
German black-and-white films
1930s German films